Kerewe, or Kerebe, is a Bantu language of Tanzania, spoken on Ukerewe Island in Lake Victoria, the largest inland island in Africa.

Kerewe phonology prohibits vowel sequences: if a vowel sequence arises in the underlying representation of a phrase, the sequence becomes either a long vowel or a glide followed by a long vowel in the surface representation.

Literature 
n December 1877 two Anglican missionaries Shergold Smith and Mr. O’Neill were martyred on Ukerewe Island by King Lukonge. In 1868 the Missionaries of Africa, known as the White Fathers (Pères Blancs) arrived at the Lake Victoria region in 1879, and at Ukerewe island in 1880.  The first attempts at Bible translation into Kerewe were some Bible stories in 1899, liturgical Gospels in 1921 and 1937 and Gospel harmony in 1930.  The New Testament was translated into Kerewe by French Canadian Padri Almas Simard (1907-1954) from the White Fathers, working with several native speakers. The translation received the Imprimatur on 4th October 1945 from Bishop Anton Oomen (1876-1957), Vicar Apostolic of Mwanza.  It published as Omulago Muhya, (Kikahindurwa mu Kikerewe) at the White Fathers Mission Press in Bukerewe. It included headings, footnotes and cross-references.

See also
 Kerewe people

References

 See My Language: A History of Bible Translation in East Africa by Aloo Osotsi Mojola published in 1999

Languages of Tanzania
Great Lakes Bantu languages